Thegotiçs is the field of study concerned with the morphological, functional, evolutionary and behavioural elements of thegosis and the treatment of its related physical, emotional, and social disorders.

History 
In 1958, a dentist from Christchurch named Dr. R.G. Every made the claim that human tooth grinding was actually tooth sharpening, at a dental conference in Christchurch, New Zealand. The relevance of extreme mandibular movements, which was this discovery's biological and clinical significance, was published in The Lancet.

Homer first documented the phenomena of a particular tooth-sharpening behaviour. He noted that the phrase for the intrinsic tooth-sharpening behaviour. The Greek word for this behaviour is Thego which means to whet and sharpen, and metaphorically, to stir and stimulate.

Many animals, both vertebrates and invertebrates, have evolved this behaviour, and it provides the same biological benefit in each one: the efficient use of teeth and tooth-like structures as tools and/or weapons.

Critical review 
There has been general acceptance of the phenomenon in some scientific disciplines but in the medical science disciplines, there has been strong criticism.

References 

Science-related lists
Dentistry-related lists